David Quint is an American literary historian, currently a Sterling Professor at Yale University, and also a published author.

References

Year of birth missing (living people)
Living people
Yale Sterling Professors
21st-century American historians
21st-century American male writers
American male non-fiction writers